London College of Music Examinations (LCM Examinations) is an examinations board offering graded and diploma qualifications in music, as well as in drama and communication. The board is a department of the London College of Music (LCM), a school within the University of West London.

LCM Examinations was founded as the external examinations department of the London College of Music (LCM), a music conservatoire which was founded in 1887. In 1991, the LCM and its external examinations board became part of the Polytechnic of West London (which became Thames Valley University in 1992 and was renamed the University of West London in 2011).

LCM Examinations is one of four examination boards in the United Kingdom accredited by Ofqual to award graded and diploma qualifications in music as part of the Qualifications and Credit Framework (along with the Associated Board of the Royal Schools of Music, Trinity College London and Rockschool). It is also one of four boards accredited to award qualifications in speech and drama (along with Trinity College London, the London Academy of Music and Dramatic Art and the English Speaking Board).

The mapping of LCM Examinations onto the QCF means that candidates applying to UK universities through the UCAS system can increase their points tariff if they have been awarded a Pass or higher at grades 6–8 in accredited subjects.

In addition to its work throughout the UK and Ireland, LCM Examinations has a significant international operation, particularly in South-East Asia.

Introductory Examinations 

Pre-Grade 1 exams ('Steps') are offered in various subjects, including piano, jazz piano, electronic keyboard, percussion, guitar, recorder, violin, clarinet, saxophone and speech & drama.

Additionally, Early Learning exams are offered, both individually and for groups.

Graded Practical Examinations 

a. Music

Graded exams are numbered 1–8, with 8 being the highest standard. An exceptionally wide range of subjects is available, including piano, all orchestral instruments, jazz (wind, brass and piano), singing, classical guitar, electronic keyboard and organ, drum kit, percussion, popular music vocals, Irish and Scottish traditional music, church music and ensemble.

Examinations in electric, rock, bass and acoustic guitars are offered in partnership with the Registry of Guitar Tutors.

Examinations in musical theatre represent a partnership between the music and drama subject areas.

b. Drama & Communication

A range of exams in drama & communication includes speech & drama, acting, public speaking, verse speaking, oral communication, group performance and spoken English in religion.

Examinations in musical theatre represent a partnership between the music and drama subject areas.

Recital Grades 

A range of 'recital grades' is offered, allowing candidates to enter for a graded exam focusing entirely (or predominantly) on performance. Candidates are required to perform four pieces, plus either a fifth piece or viva voce or sight reading.

Leisure Play Examinations 

Leisure Play exams are offered in all music subjects, and are intended for candidates who wish to take a more performance-based, less 'academic' route. Typically, candidates will perform 4 pieces (including 1 own choice piece) rather than the standard 3, but with no additional tests. Leisure Play exams are offered at Levels 1–8.

Performance Awards 

Performance Awards are assessed via DVD submission, rather than attendance at an examination centre. Candidates submit a DVD recording; requirements are generally the same as the Performance component of the equivalent graded exam. Performance Awards are offered at Levels 1–8.

Theory Examinations 

Written theory examinations are offered at nine levels (Preliminary and Grades 1–8), in both Theory of Music and Popular Music Theory (in association with the Examinations Registry). Written examinations are held twice per year.
Graded examinations in composition are also available.

Diplomas 

a. Diploma Levels

Diplomas are offered at four levels:

 Diploma of the London College of Music (DipLCM)
 Associate of the London College of Music (ALCM)
 Licentiate of the London College of Music (LLCM)
 Fellowship of the London College of Music (FLCM)
These qualifications permit the holder to append the qualification's letters after their name (for example, "Forename Surname LLCM").

b. Music

Diplomas in music performance and teaching are regulated by Ofqual and placed at levels 4-7 of the Qualifications and Credit Framework. They are offered in a wide range of subjects covering classical, jazz, popular and traditional music genres.

Three levels of written theoretical diplomas are offered: DipMusLCM, AMusLCM and LMusLCM.

Additionally, LCM offers diplomas in composition and conducting, by thesis, and by professional achievement.

c. Drama & Communication

A range of diplomas in drama & communication subjects is offered, at DipLCM, ALCM, LLCM and FLCM levels. These include performance, teaching, acting, verse speaking, reading and public speaking. An FLCM by thesis is also available.

Publications 

A range of publications is available, including all-inclusive handbooks (containing everything required for the examination) for selected instruments, CD recordings, theory workbooks, specimen test books, and an anthology for drama & communication candidates.

Downloads of recordings and theory papers are available from http://www.lcmebooks.org

References 

Performing arts education in the United Kingdom
Music education in the United Kingdom
Music in London
1887 establishments in England
Educational institutions established in 1887